Idit Buch is a computational biologist who is the Vice President of Computational Biology at Emendo.

Education
Buch has a Ph.D. In computer biology from Tel Aviv University (TAU) in 2011.   Her advisors were Ruth Nussinov and Haim J. Wolfson. Her thesis was entitled In Silico Design, Construction & Validation of Protein Nanostructures.  She also has a has a M. Sc. and MA in computer Science also from TAU.

Select publications
 Buch I, Brooks BR, Wolfson HJ, Nussinov R. Computational validation of protein nanotubes. Nano Lett. 2009 Mar;9(3):1096-102. doi: 10.1021/nl803521j. PMID 19199488; PMCID: PMC3536542

References

Living people
Women computational biologists
Year of birth missing (living people)

Israeli scientists
Tel Aviv University alumni